Changshin University is a private Christian university located in Changwon City, South Gyeongsang province, near the southern coast of South Korea.  It employs about 60 instructors on two campuses.  Graduating classes number around 2,000.

Academics
The school's academic departments are divided into four divisions:  engineering, artistic training, social science, and natural science.

History

The school opened as Chang Shin Technical College (창신전문대학) in 1991, with a legal maximum intake of 480.  The second campus was opened in 2003.  It was acquired by Booyoung Group on August 1, 2019.

Sister schools

The college's first international sisterhood relationship was established in 1993 with Germany's Berlin University of Applied Science and Technology.  Since then, additional relationships have been forged with China's Minzu University and Yanbian University of Science and Technology, America's Illinois State University and Biola University, the Philippine University of the Philippines, Yugoslavia's Megatrend University, Russia's Amur State University, Switzerland's Winterthur University, and Australia's University of Newcastle.  At any given time, between 30 and 40 students from Changshin University are studying at these institutions, and a similar number of foreign students are studying at Chang Shin.

See also
List of colleges and universities in South Korea
Education in South Korea

External links
Official school website, in English

Universities and colleges in South Gyeongsang Province